Cole Creek is a stream in the U.S. state of South Dakota.

Cole Creek has the name of Dick Cole, a pioneer stagecoach operator.

See also
List of rivers of South Dakota

References

Rivers of Lawrence County, South Dakota
Rivers of South Dakota